Nicky Gogan is an Irish film director, writer and producer. She is the director of the experimental film festival Darklight Film Festival. She is also a founder and director of the Irish film production company Still Films

Film career
Nicky's first feature film, Seaview, is a documentary about the lives of refugees held in direct provision in Ireland. She co-directed and produced with filmmaker Paul Rowley. The film was commended as "powerful" by the Wall Street Journal. The film was nominated for "Best Documentary" at the 2009 Irish Film and Television Awards. Nicky has gone on to produce over 19 films of which she has directed 3. Her work spans a diverse range of mediums and genres from documentary, experimental, animation and drama.

References

External links 

 
 

Irish women film directors
Irish documentary film directors
Irish film producers
Irish women screenwriters
Year of birth missing (living people)
Living people
Irish women film producers